The Algol family of solid-fuel rocket stages and boosters is built by Aerojet (now Aerojet Rocketdyne) and used on a variety of launch vehicles. It was developed by Aerojet from the earlier Jupiter Senior and the Navy Polaris programs. Upgrades to the Algol motor occurred from 1960 until the retirement of the Scout launch vehicle in 1994.

The Algol family use solid propellant fuel with a loaded mass of 10,705kg, and produces 470.93 kN of thrust. The vehicle also has a Specific Impulse of 236 seconds in a vacuum environment. Variations Algol I, I-D, II, II-A, II-BA popular rating was 40KS-115,000 (52,000 kgf for 40 seconds), also known as Senior.

They were initially developed as the first-stage of propulsion for the Scout rocket, with the design being based on the UGM-27 Polaris, a submarine-launched ballistic missile developed for the United States Navy at the Jet Propulsion Laboratory.

Algol 1 (XM-68) 
 Algol 1 (XM-68)
This rocket design started as the Polaris test motor, 31 feet in length with a  diameter steel case, and 86,000 lb. of thrust.

The Algol 1 was first used for a successful suborbital launch of a Scout X-1 rocket on September 2, 1960.  The rocket started as a UGM-27 Polaris test motor with a 40-inch diameter,  the largest solid motor ever tested at the time .  It had a nominal performance rating of 45 seconds duration and 45,000 kgf thrust.

Scaled up to  diameter. Later versions for Scout D scaled to 

 Algol 1-A
Used on the Scout X (Cub Scout) test flight flown April 18, 1960. served as prototype vehicle for eventual Scout rocket.

Algol 1-B
Used on Scout X-1, RM-89 Blue Scout I, and RM-90 Blue Scout II.

Algol 1-C
Used on the Scout X-1A. After this single flight, the Scout X-2 with Algol 1-D replaced this prototype.

 Algol 1-D
Used with Scout X-2, Scout X-2M and Little Joe II. Solid rocket stage. 440.00 kN (98,916 lbf) thrust. Mass .
It was first used on the Scout X-2 on March 29, 1962. It continued to be used on Scout X-2 and Scout X-2M launches (4) until 1963.

Algol 1-D was first used on the Little Joe II Qualification Test Vehicle in 1963.

May 13, 1964 – Algol Boosts Little Joe II A-001 flight.
An Aerojet-built Algol 1D heavy-duty rocket motor performed successfully for the 36th consecutive time on May 13, 1964, as it carried a NASA Little Joe II spacecraft on the Apollo program A-001 test flight. Averaging 96,650 pounds thrust, the Algol 1D was the largest solid rocket motor flying in non-military space programs. Test hardware on May's successful Apollo test flight included: an unmanned instrumented command module, service module, launch escape system and the Little Joe II launch system.

Algol engine used on Little Joe II
Thrust: 465 kN each
Length: 9.1 m
Diameter: 1 m
Weight full: 10,180 kg
Weight empty: 1,900 kg
Fuel: solid
Burn time: 40 s

Status: Retired 1966. 
Gross mass: . 
Unfuelled mass: . 
Height: . 
Diameter: . 
Thrust: 440.00 kN (98,910 lbf). 
Burn time: 44 s. 
Number: 20.

Algol II 

The Algol 2 (Algol II) series was first flown in 1962.
It was used a first stage on Scout A, Scout B, Scout X-3, Scout X-4; 
It was proposed as a strap-on motor for the Titan 3BAS2 variant (cancelled). It was also proposed for the Athena RTX program in 1969, losing to Thikol.<GAO> B-165488, JAN. 17, 1969. Thrust (sl): 513.300 kN (115,394 lbf; 52,347 kgf).

The 3BAS2 configuration of Titan 3B rocket proposed by Martin in the mid-1960s would have been used for deep space missions with a Centaur upper stage, Algol strap-on for liftoff thrust augmentation. It was never flown.

CSD solid rocket engine. 564.2 kN. Isp=255s. 
Gross mass: . 
Unfuelled mass: . 
Height: . 
Diameter: . 
Thrust: 564.20 kN (126,837 lbf). 
Specific impulse: 255 s. 
Specific impulse sea level: 232 s.

The Algol II-A was introduced in 1963 using the Aerojet 40 KS motor. It first flew on Scout-X3 in 1963.

The Algol II-B was created after an Algol II-A flight failure, the nozzle was designed and designate the II-B model. It first flew on Scout-X4

The Algol II-C flew on Scout A1 and B1. Scout-A2, -B2, -C and -2 versions planned for Algol II-C were never used.

See also 
 UGM-27 Polaris
 Graphite-Epoxy Motor
 Little Joe
 Scout (rocket family)
 Vega (rocket)

References 

Rocket stages
Solid-fuel rockets